The England national cricket team toured India in 2001-02, playing a three-match Test series and six-match ODI series versus India.

Background 
The tour schedule was announced on 12 September 2001. England were to play three three-day tour games ahead of the Test series and three one-day games before the ODI series. The five-match ODI series was converted into a six-match affair after a demand by the Board of Control for Cricket in India (BCCI) to play the final ODI at the Eden Gardens in Kolkata. After an initial disagreement, the England and Wales Cricket Board agreed to the demand after the BCCI was reported as saying that India would not honour their commitment to play four Tests in England next summer.

Squads

A 16-man England squad for the India and New Zealand Test series was announced in late August 2001. Two uncapped players, Essex wicket-keeper James Foster and Yorkshire off-spinner Richard Dawson were included for the first time, while Lancashire wicket-keeper Warren Hegg was recalled to the squad. On 17 October, England's 16-man squad for the ODI series was announced. It included the same side that toured Zimbabwe earlier that month, with additions of Andrew Caddick, Darren Gough, Ashley Giles, Michael Vaughan and Craig White. Paul Grayson, James Kirtley, Mark Ramprakash, Ryan Sidebottom and Chris Silverwood were omitted. Amidst questions regarding security of the players, Andrew Caddick and James Foster decided not to tour India and declared themselves unavailable on 30 October. They were replaced by Somerset pace-bowler Richard Johnson and Gloucestershire off-spinner Martyn Ball. Giles, White and James Ormond who were nursing injuries were declared fit on 7 November. Graham Thorpe left for England just before the Second Test due to "personal" reasons and was replaced by Michael Vaughan. On 3 January 2002, The England squad was announced again for the ODI series. The core of the team that played the Test series was retained. Additionally, Caddick and Thorpe, who made themselves available, were added to the squad, while White who sustained an injury was excluded.

The Indian selectors named a 14-man squad for the First Test on 27 November. From the squad that toured South Africa earlier that season, four pace-bowlers were dropped and Javagal Srinath was recovering from an injury. Maharashtra and Kerala pace-bowlers Iqbal Siddiqui and Tinu Yohannan respectively were included in the squad alongside Railways all-rounder Sanjay Bangar. Virender Sehwag, who was included for the First test despite a one-match ban on him, was dropped from the squad. He returned for the Second Test with Srinath, the latter replacing an injured Bangar. An India 14-man ODI squad announced on 14 January for the first three ODIs. Rahul Dravid pulled out of the series due to shoulder injury. Wicket-keeper Ajay Ratra and Tamil Nadu batsman Hemang Badani were new inclusions to the squad.

Test series

1st Test

2nd Test

3rd Test

ODI series

1st ODI

India got off to a good start after electing to bat upon winning the toss. Openers Sourav Ganguly and Sachin Tendulkar took their team score to 50 in the tenth over before Andrew Flintoff dismissed them both in his first spell. Dinesh Mongia top-scored for India with 71 after reaching 50 in as many balls. His partners VVS Laxman and Virender Sehwag added 55 and 43 runs with him before being dismissed, who were followed by Ajit Agarkar and Ajay Ratra in quick succession. A partnership of 38 between Hemang Badani and Harbhajan Singh towards the end took India's total to 281.

England's reply began with Nick Knight being declared lbw in the second ball of their innings. A second wicket partnership of 63 runs between opener Marcus Trescothick and captain Nasser Hussain steadied their chase. Hussain and later Michael Vaughan partnered Trescothick to add 80 runs between overs 10 and 20, before Paul Collingwood made 21 in a stand of 61 with the former. Trescothick reached his century in 80 balls, before being dismissed in controversial manner. He was adjudged out lbw, although replays showed the ball pitching well outside leg stump before hitting the pads. England's last six wickets fell for 35 runs, and were all out for 259, handing India a 22-run win.

2nd ODI

3rd ODI

4th ODI

5th ODI

6th ODI

Tour matches

Three-day: Mumbai Board President's XI v England XI

Three-day: Indian Board President's XI v England XI

Three-day: India A v England XI

One-day: Cricket Association of Bengal XI v England XI

References

External links 
 Tour home at ESPNcricinfo
 
 
 

2001 in English cricket
2001 in Indian cricket
2002 in English cricket
2002 in Indian cricket
2001–02
Indian cricket seasons from 2000–01
International cricket competitions in 2001–02